Green Bay may refer to:

Geography

Bodies of water
 Green Bay (Lake Michigan), a bay of Wisconsin known to locals as the Bay of Green Bay
 Green Bay, Newfoundland and Labrador, a bay located on the island of Newfoundland

Municipalities
 Green Bay, Wisconsin, United States 
 Green Bay (town), Wisconsin, United States
 Green Bay, New Zealand
 Green Bay, Nova Scotia, Canada
 Green Bay, small community of Northeastern Manitoulin and the Islands, Ontario, Canada
 Green Bay, Virginia (disambiguation), United States
 Greenbay, village in Antigua

Sports teams

Associated with Green Bay, Wisconsin
 Green Bay Packers, an American football team and the best-known Green Bay sports team
 Green Bay Blizzard, a professional arena football team
 Green Bay Bombers, a former indoor arena American football team
 Green Bay Booyah, a baseball team
 Green Bay Gamblers, a Tier 1 junior ice hockey team
 Green Bay Phoenix, the athletic program of the University of Wisconsin–Green Bay

Other
 Green Bay (American Samoa football club), an association football club in Faga'alu, American Samoa

Other
Roman Catholic Diocese of Green Bay, Wisconsin
Green Bay Marathon

See also 
 Baie Verte (disambiguation)
 USS Green Bay